"I MY MIE" is the debut album of Japanese singer MIE. The album was released on August 21, 1981, less than five months after the dissolution of her group Pink Lady. It was reissued on October 24, 2007 as "I MY MIE +1", with one bonus track.

Track listing 
All lyrics by Yoko Aki, music by Ryudo Uzaki. All arrangement by Mitsuo Hagita except where indicated.

Side A

Side B

2007 CD bonus track

References

External links
 
 
 

1981 debut albums
Mie albums
Japanese-language albums
Victor Entertainment albums